Kevin Royal Johnson (born November 21, 1961) is an American author and singer-songwriter living in Baltimore, Maryland. He is the founding member of the band The Linemen.

Early life 
Johnson was raised and educated in Van Buren, Arkansas until the age of 10, when he moved to Little Rock where he lived until the age of 18. He attended Little Rock Central High School and then moved to Nashville, to attend Vanderbilt University, where he graduated with a degree in electrical engineering in 1984.

Career

Author 
Johnson is the author of three books, The Celluloid Paper Trail: Identification and Description of Twentieth Century Film Scripts, The Dark Page: Books That Inspired American Film Noir 1940–1949 and The Dark Page II: Books That Inspired American Film Noir 1950–1965. All three books were published by the Oak Knoll Press.

Johnson has taught on the subject of film script identification at Yale University, the Academy of Motion Picture Arts and Sciences, and Rare Book School at the University of Virginia.

Antiquarian bookseller 
Johnson founded Royal Books, Inc. in Baltimore, Maryland in 1998. He has been a member of the Antiquarian Booksellers' Association of America since 2002 and between 2007 and 2013 was on the faculty (and subsequently the director of) the Colorado Antiquarian Book Seminar.

Musical career 
Johnson began playing music as a solo performer while at Vanderbilt, and in 1984 moved to the Washington, DC area, where he played the pub circuit, most notably with singer-songwriter Mary Chapin Carpenter. He formed his first band The Revellaires in 1987, releasing one record entitled Pop of Ages.

In 1991 he formed The Linemen with Eric Brace, Antoine Sanfuentes, and Bill Williams. Between 1991 and 2001 the band released four records under Johnson's own SAM Records label, with new members Tony Flagg (bass) and Scott McKnight (guitar) replacing Brace and Williams in 1994, and adding James Key (mandolin) and Dave Giegerich (dobro, steel guitar).

Johnson's first album with the Linemen, Memphis for Breakfast, was recorded at Ardent Studios in Memphis, Tennessee, and produced by John Alagía. Johnson's second album, The Rest of Your Life, was also produced by Alagía and designed by Jeff Nelson. Johnson's third album with the Linemen, Parole Music, was produced by Charlie Chesterman.

In 2012, The Linemen reformed, adding Jonathan Gregg as a second lead vocalist, lead guitarist, and pedal steel guitarist, and with band alumni Scott McKnight (bass), Bill Williams (guitar, slide guitar, mandolin), and Antoine Sanfuentes (drums). In the fall of 2016 they released their first album, Close the Place Down, recorded by Andrew Taub at Brooklyn Recording and worked once again with John Alagia.

Johnson has performed (both solo and with the Linemen) on NPR's Mountain Stage as well as CBGB, 9:30 Club, the Modell Performing Arts Center, and The Birchmere.

Critical reception 
The Dark Page: Books That Inspired American Film Noir 1940–1949 was reviewed positively in Film Comment magazine, and given 7/10 stars by PopMatters. The first volume was blurbed by Los Angeles Times film critic Kenneth Turan, who described the book as having "compelling reproductions of first edition jackets alternating with pithy, knowledgeable text about both the books and the films." Dave Heating from Erasing Cloud wrote that "it's one of those books that reminds you of the magic of books themselves," and Laura Rattray of University of Chicago Press' journal The Papers of the Bibliographical Society of America called the book "a visual feast."

Film critic Leonard Maltin wrote that The Dark Page II: Books That Inspired American Film Noir 1950–1965 "has much to offer, both as a reference and as a source of sheer pleasure."

Bibliography

Discography

The Revellaires 
 Pop of Ages (1987), Top Records

Kevin Johnson and the Linemen 
 Memphis for Breakfast (1991), SAM Records
 The Rest of Your Life (1994), SAM Records
 Parole Music (1997), SAM Records
 Sunday Driver (2000), SAM Records
 Various Artists Americana Motel (2001) – compilation on Bay Gumbo Music

The Linemen 
 Close the Place Down (2016), SAM Records

References

External links 
https://www.royalbooks.com/

1961 births
Living people
20th-century American writers
American country guitarists
American male guitarists
20th-century American guitarists
20th-century American male musicians